Türkiye Petrol Rafinerileri A.Ş. is a company in Turkey, operating four refineries with a total capacity to handle an annual 30 mn tons of crude.

Introduction
Tüpraş operates four oil refineries, three of which process imported crude. The 11 million tonnes a year Izmit refinery at Izmit in north west Turkey and the 11 million tonnes/yr Izmir refinery at Aliaga on Turkey's central Aegean coast process crude from global markets delivered by tanker while the 5 million tonnes/yr Kirikkale refinery at Kirrikale in central Turkey processes crude delivered to Turkey's Mediterranean oil hub at Ceyhan and transited to the refinery via a bespoke pipeline.
The fourth refinery, the 1.1 million tonnes/yr batman refinery processes crude produced a myriad small oil fields in south east Turkey delivered to the refinery both via an existing pipeline network and by road tanker.

Tupras also owns a majority stake (79,98%) in the shipping company DİTAŞ and, since 2006, a 40% ownership of petrol retailer Opet.

The company's origins go back to İPRAŞ (İstanbul Petrol Rafinerisi A.Ş.) established by the U.S. Caltex Company (now part of Chevron).  In 1983, İPRAŞ and three other publicly owned refineries were brought into state control under the Tüpraş umbrella.  Partial privatisation started in 1991, when an IPO sold 2.5% of shares to the public; by 2005 a number of secondary issues had taken this up to 49%.  In 2005, a consortium of Koç Holding and Shell bid over $4billion to acquire the 51% interest remaining; this was through a new joint venture company, Enerji Yatırımları A.Ş. The company’s shares were divided among the shareholders as follows: Koç Holding A.Ş. 75%, Aygaz A.Ş. 20%, OPET Petrolcülük A.Ş. 3%, Shell Overseas Investment B.V. 1.9% and the Shell Company of Turkey Ltd. 0.1%.

Refineries
Tüpraş controls most of Turkey’s refining capacity and owns 57% of the total petroleum products storage capacity; it also has a strong indirect downstream position through its shareholding in Opet.

See also

List of companies of Turkey
Tüpraş Batman Oil Refinery
Tüpraş Izmir Oil Refinery
Tüpraş Izmit Oil Refinery
Tüpraş Kırıkkale Oil Refinery

References 

 
Oil and gas companies of Turkey
Petrochemical companies
Companies listed on the Istanbul Stock Exchange
Chemical companies established in 1983
Koç family
Turkish companies established in 1983
Economy of Kocaeli Province
Şişli
Turkish brands
Oil refineries in Turkey
Energy companies established in 1983